The UK Synaesthesia Association was originally conceived by Professor Simon Baron-Cohen, and was fully established as an active society by Professor Jamie Ward, both of whom are leading researchers into synaesthesia. The association is run by a committee, including Dr Giles Hamilton-Fletcher, Professor Julia Simner, and President James Wannerton.


Activities
The Association brings scientists, researchers, artists, students and synaesthetes together and provides verifiable and reliable information regarding the condition for the media and any other interested parties. The UKSA operates as a non-profit making organisation and has an open membership scheme. The Association produces entertaining and educational information for its members and also holds an international conferences with eminent guest speakers including scientists, researchers and synaesthetes themselves. At its 2016 Annual International Meeting at Trinity College Dublin, the U.K. Synaesthesia Association awarded its inaugural prize recognising an outstanding young scientist or artist. The Moyra Sonley Early Career Prize in Multisensory Research recognises a promising early career scientist or artist working in multi-sensory processing. The inaugural prize (2016) was shared by James Hughes and Francesca Farina.

References

External links
 Official web site

Synesthesia
Psychology organisations based in the United Kingdom
Organisations based in Bedfordshire
Neurology organizations
Health charities in the United Kingdom